France participated in the Eurovision Song Contest 2014 with the song "Moustache" written by Pierre Beyres, Kim N'Guyen, Lorent Idir and François Ardouvin. The song was performed by the band Twin Twin. The French broadcaster France Télévisions in collaboration with the television channel France 3 organised a national final in order to select the French entry for the 2014 contest in Copenhagen, Denmark. Three songs competed in the national final which took place during the France 3 programme Les chansons d'abord. On 2 March 2014, "Moustache" performed by Twin Twin was officially announced by France 3 as the winner following the combination of votes from a jury panel and a public vote.

As a member of the "Big Five", France automatically qualified to compete in the final of the Eurovision Song Contest. Performing in position 14, France placed twenty-sixth (last) out of the 26 participating countries with 2 points. This marked the first time that the nation had placed last in the history of the competition.

Background 

France first won the contest in 1958 with "Dors, mon amour" performed by André Claveau. In the 1960s, they won three times, with "Tom Pillibi" performed by Jacqueline Boyer in 1960, "Un premier amour" performed by Isabelle Aubret in 1962 and "Un jour, un enfant" performed by Frida Boccara, who won in 1969 in a four-way tie with the Netherlands, Spain and the United Kingdom. France's fifth victory came in 1977, when Marie Myriam won with the song "L'oiseau et l'enfant". France have also finished second four times, with Paule Desjardins in 1957, Catherine Ferry in 1976, Joëlle Ursull in 1990 and Amina in 1991, who lost out to Sweden's Carola in a tie-break. In the 21st century, France has had less success, only making the top ten three times, with Natasha St-Pier finishing fourth in 2001, Sandrine François finishing fifth in 2002 and Patricia Kaas finishing eighth in 2009. In 2013, the nation finished in twenty-third place with the song "L'enfer et moi" performed by Amandine Bourgeois.

The French national broadcaster, France Télévisions, broadcasts the event within France and delegates the selection of the nation's entry to the television channel France 3. France 3 confirmed that France would participate in the 2014 Eurovision Song Contest on 27 September 2013. The French broadcaster had used both national finals and internal selection to choose the French entry in the past. From 2008 to 2013, the broadcaster opted to internally select the French entry. In November 2013, the broadcaster announced that the 2014 French entry would be selected via a national final that would feature three competing acts. This marked the first time since 2007 that a national final would be organised to select the French entry.

Before Eurovision

National final 
The French national final consisted of two shows on 26 January and 2 March 2014, both taking place during the France 3 programme Les chansons d'abord at the France 3 studios in Le Pré-Saint-Gervais, Paris and hosted by Canadian singer Natasha St-Pier who represented France in the 2001 Contest. The shows were broadcast on France 3 as well as online via the broadcaster's official website francetvinfo.fr.

Competing entries 
France 3 opened a submission period on 4 October 2013 in order for interested artists and songwriters to submit their proposals up until the deadline on 24 November 2013. Performers over 16 years of age were eligible for consideration, while songs were required to contain a majority of French language lyrics with a free language allowance for the remaining lyrics, and should not be instrumental pieces that extensively lacked vocals. A fourteen-member selection committee consisting of representatives of France Télévisions, music industry professionals and Eurovision fans reviewed the received submissions via a blind audio listening on 26 November 2013 and shortlisted five entries, before finalising their decision of the three entries to compete in the national final. One of the committee members was selected from a public competition organised by France 3 in collaboration with France Bleu, which applicants were required to successfully answer three questions related to the Eurovision Song Contest in order to enter a draw. The selection committee consisted of:

 Laurent Bentata – General director of Stage Entertainment France
 Bruno Berberes – Casting and artistic director
 Laura Cès – Singer and comedian
 Mary De Vivo – Director of Le Réservoir
 Valérie Michelin – Music manager
 Franck Saurat – Television and entertainment producer
 Thierry Langlois – France 3 programmes director
 Yann Chapellon – France Télévisions president and distribution director
 Marie Claire Mezerette – France 3 entertainment director
 Frédéric Valencak – Head of Delegation for France at the Eurovision Song Contest
 Olivier Daube – France Ô representative
 Dominique Bourron – France Bleu representative
 Farouk Vallette – OGAE France representative
 Morgane Buret – Public competition winner

The competing artists were announced on 27 November 2013. On 24 January 2014, 30-second clips of the competing songs were previewed during the Europe 1 radio programme Le grand direct des médias, hosted by Jean-Marc Morandini.

Final 
The competing artists presented their entries to the public on 26 January 2014 during the first show, which also featured guest appearances by Former French Eurovision entrants Marie Myriam (1977), Amaury Vassili (2011) and Anggun (2012). Following the show, the entries were given increased exposure and rotation through recap programmes on France 3 and France Bleu, and the public was able to vote for their favourite song through telephone, SMS and online voting until 23 February 2014. The winner, "Moustache" performed by Twin Twin, was determined by the combination of the public vote (50%) and a jury panel (50%) and announced on 2 March 2014 during the second show.

At Eurovision

According to Eurovision rules, all nations with the exceptions of the host country and the "Big Five" (France, Germany, Italy, Spain and the United Kingdom) are required to qualify from one of two semi-finals in order to compete for the final; the top ten countries from each semi-final progress to the final. As a member of the "Big 5", France automatically qualified to compete in the final on 10 May 2014. In addition to their participation in the final, France is also required to broadcast and vote in one of the two semi-finals. During the semi-final allocation draw on 20 January 2014, France was assigned to broadcast and vote in the first semi-final on 6 May 2014.

In France, the two semi-finals was broadcast on France Ô with commentary by Audrey Chauveau and Bruno Berberes, while the final was broadcast on France 3 with commentary by Cyril Féraud and Natasha St-Pier who represented France in the 2001 Contest. The French spokesperson, who announced the French votes during the final, was Elodie Suigo.

Final 
Twin Twin took part in technical rehearsals on 4 and 6 May, followed by dress rehearsals on 9 and 10 May. This included the jury final on 9 May where the professional juries of each country watched and voted on the competing entries. After technical rehearsals were held on 6 May, the "Big 5" countries and host nation Denmark held a press conference. As part of this press conference, the artists took part in a draw to determine which half of the grand final they would subsequently participate in. France was drawn to compete in the second half. Following the conclusion of the second semi-final, the shows' producers decided upon the running order of the final. The running order for the semi-finals and final was decided by the shows' producers rather than through another draw, so that similar songs were not placed next to each other. France was subsequently placed to perform in position 14, following the entry from Sweden and before the entry from Russia.

The French performance featured the members of Twin Twin on stage dressed in colourful clothes and performing a choreographed routine with two dancers. The stage contained various colours and the LED screens displayed moustache motifs and images that beat together with the music beat. The dancers that joined Twin Twin on stage were Céline Baron and Jonathan Jenvrin. A backing vocalist, Ulrich Kwasi, was also part of the performance. France placed twenty-sixth (last) in the final, scoring 2 points. As of 2022, this remains the worst result France has ever achieved in the contest, and also the first time that it had finished last.

Voting 
Voting during the three shows consisted of 50 percent public televoting and 50 percent from a jury deliberation. The jury consisted of five music industry professionals who were citizens of the country they represent, with their names published before the contest to ensure transparency. This jury was asked to judge each contestant based on: vocal capacity; the stage performance; the song's composition and originality; and the overall impression by the act. In addition, no member of a national jury could be related in any way to any of the competing acts in such a way that they cannot vote impartially and independently. The individual rankings of each jury member were released shortly after the grand final.

Following the release of the full split voting by the EBU after the conclusion of the competition, it was revealed that France had placed twenty-sixth with the public televote and the jury vote. In the public vote, France scored 1 points and in the jury vote the nation scored 5 points.

Below is a breakdown of points awarded to France and awarded by France in the first semi-final and grand final of the contest, and the breakdown of the jury voting and televoting conducted during the two shows:

Points awarded to France

Points awarded by France

Detailed voting results
The following members comprised the French jury:
 Fabrice Marchal (jury chairperson)producer
 Jean-Marc Sauvagnargueswriter, composer, drummer, represented France in the 2007 contest as member of Les Fatals Picards
 Fanny Lladosinger
 Julie Soliasinger, lyricist
 writer, lyricist of the 1973 and 1975 Monegasque contest entries "Un train qui part" and "Une chanson c'est une lettre", and the 2013 French contest entry "L'enfer et moi"

References

2014
Countries in the Eurovision Song Contest 2014
Eurovision
Eurovision
Articles containing video clips